Lampracanthia is a genus of shore bugs in the family Saldidae. There is one described species in Lampracanthia, L. crassicornis.

References

Further reading

 
 

Articles created by Qbugbot
Heteroptera genera
Saldidae